Cutleaf anemone is a common name for several plant species and may refer to:

 Anemone multifida Poir.
Pulsatilla nuttalliana
 Pulsatilla patens  subsp. multifida, synonym: Anemone multifida (Pritz.) Zamels, non Poir.